Cheslin Kolbe (born 28 October 1993) is a South African professional rugby union player who currently plays for the South Africa national team and for  in the Top 14 in France. His regular position is wing, but he also plays at fullback. He has also recently featured at fly half for Toulouse in the top 14, and as a scrum half for the Boks. Kolbe was a member of the South Africa Sevens team that won a bronze medal at the 2016 Summer Olympics. He was a member of the South Africa team that won the 2019 Rugby World Cup. Playing at right wing, he scored South Africa's second try in the final minutes of the final. 

Kolbe was nominated for 2019 World Rugby Player of the Year but lost to South Africa teammate Pieter-Steph du Toit. He is widely regarded as one of the best players in the world. He previously played for Toulouse in the Top14, the Stormers in super rugby, and Western Province in the Currie Cup. He has won the World Cup, Rugby Championship, and Lions Series with the Boks, the Top14, and Champions Cup with Toulouse, and Currie Cup with the Western Province.

He is contracted until 2024 with RC Toulonnais. He has scored 9 tries in 18 tests for South Africa. He is one of the fastest rugby players ever with a 10.70 for the 100m. He is famous for his small size, but brilliant finishing skills, pace, and side stepping ability. He is part of Roc Nation, the Gilbert rugby family, Laureus, and Nike. He is the SA players player of the year 2021.

Youth rugby

Kolbe played for Hoërskool Brackenfell. He represented  at various youth levels, from the Under-16 Grant Khomo Week in 2009 to the 2012 Under-21 Provincial Championship.

Club career

Western Province

In October 2013 he was part of the Western Province team that won the Currie Cup by beating the Lions 19-16.

He penned a three-year deal to remain at Western Province until 2016.

Toulouse

Kolbe moved to France to join Top 14 side  for the 2017–2018 season. Kolbe received a call-up to the South Africa national team for the 2018 Rugby Championship. He made his debut for South Africa against  on 8 September, during Round Three of the competition, coming on in the 33rd minute as an injury replacement for Makazole Mapimpi, in a match that South Africa lost 18–23.

In June 2019 Kolbe started for Stade Toulousain in the Top 14 final winning the French Championship. In 2021 Kolbe won both the European Cup and the Top 14 with Toulouse.

International career

Kolbe made his test debut in 2018 and played an important part in Springboks winning the 2019 Rugby Championship.  On 2 November, Kolbe was part of the 2019 World-Cup winning team in Japan, scoring a try late in the second half of the Final against England. Kolbe was again instrumental in the 2021 British & Irish Lions tour to South Africa, starting in all three test matches and the South Africa A match. Kolbe scored the Springboks' only try in the third and deciding test of the tour to propel South Africa to a series win.

South Africa Under-20

In 2013, he was included in the training group that toured Argentina in preparation for the 2013 IRB Junior World Championship. He was then included in the squad for the 2013 IRB Junior World Championship.

National sevens team

Between 2012 and 2017, he represented the South Africa Sevens team. In 2013, he was included in the squad for the 2013 Rugby World Cup Sevens.
Kolbe was included in a 12-man squad for the 2016 Summer Olympics in Rio de Janeiro. He was named as a substitute for their first match in Group B of the competition against Spain, with South Africa winning the match 24–0.

Honours

Western Province
 2014 Currie Cup winner

Toulouse
Heineken Cup European Champions/European Rugby Champions Cup: 2021
Top 14 French League : 2019, 2021

South Africa 
 2019 Rugby Championship winner
 2019 Rugby World Cup winner
 2019 World Rugby Men's 15s Player of the Year nominee
 2021 British & Irish Lions tour to South Africa winner
South Africa 7's 
 2016 Olympics Bronze medal

Test Match record

Pld = Games Played, W = Games Won, D = Games Drawn, L = Games Lost, Tri = Tries Scored, Pts = Points Scored

Test tries (10)

Personal life

Kolbe is a cousin of South African track and field sprinter Wayde van Niekerk, who won the gold medal in the 400 metres at the 2016 Olympics and is the current 300m and 400m world record holder.

References

External links
 
 

South African rugby union players
Living people
1993 births
Cape Coloureds
Sportspeople from Cape Town
Western Province (rugby union) players
Stormers players
Stade Toulousain players
RC Toulonnais players
Rugby union wings
South Africa international rugby sevens players
South Africa Under-20 international rugby union players
Rugby sevens players at the 2016 Summer Olympics
Olympic rugby sevens players of South Africa
Olympic bronze medalists for South Africa
Olympic medalists in rugby sevens
Medalists at the 2016 Summer Olympics
South Africa international rugby union players
Rugby union players from the Western Cape